Wodehouse  is an English surname and barony.

The baronetcy was created in 1611, the barony in 1797. Since 1866 it has been held by the Earl of Kimberley, the current Baron Wodehouse being John Wodehouse, 5th Earl of Kimberley (born 1951).

History
The name "de Wodehouse" is attested as early as in the 11th century,  of one Bertram, of Wodehouse-tower, Yorkshire, who lived at the time of the Norman conquest.

An elaborate pedigree of the Wodehouse family of Norfolk is on record beginning with Sir David Wodehouse (b.1053) Father of Sir Constantine de Wodehouse (b.1080) -who was married to Lady Isobel Botetourt (b.1085).  John Wodehouse (died 1431) Member of Parliament for Norfolk and Suffolk, is the first of the family to be ~historically attested~ in Norfolk and arrived there as an outside administrator for the Duchy of Lancaster.

"strike strong", and at the bottom Agincourt, supported by two wild men. The native English term for "wild man", woodwose (from a putative Old English *wude-wāsa "wood-being"), has been transformed to woodhouse by popular etymology due to their appearance as supporters in the Woodhouse coat of arms.

Baronets Wodehouse:
 The baronetcy was created in 1611, for Sir Philip Wodehouse, 1st Baronet (died 1623), MP
 Sir Thomas Wodehouse, 2nd Baronet (c. 1585 – 1658), MP
 Sir Philip Wodehouse, 3rd Baronet (1608–1681), MP
 Sir John Wodehouse, 4th Baronet (1669–1754), British MP
 Sir Armine Wodehouse, 5th Baronet (c. 1714 – 1777), MP for Norfolk
Barons Wodehouse:
 John Wodehouse, 6th Baronet (1741–1834), was created Baron Wodehouse in 1797.
 John Wodehouse, 2nd Baron Wodehouse (1771–1846), British MP and then peer
Earls of Kimberley:
in 1866,  John Wodehouse, 3rd Baron (1826–1902)  was created Earl of Kimberley
 John Wodehouse, 2nd Earl of Kimberley (1848–1932), first member of the Labour Party in the House of Lords
 John Wodehouse, 3rd Earl of Kimberley (1883–1941)
 John Wodehouse, 4th Earl of Kimberley (1924–2002)
 John Wodehouse, 5th Earl of Kimberley (born 1951)

Sir Armine Wodehouse, 5th Baronet had an older brother, William Wodehouse (possibly 1706–1737), who died of smallpox. Other descendants of Sir Armine Wodehouse include:
Reverend Philip Wodehouse (1745–1811), son of Sir Armine Wodehouse, 5th Baronet
 Lt.-Col. Philip Wodehouse (1788–1846), 15th The King's Hussars (Battle of Waterloo)
 Colonel Edwin Wodehouse (1817–1870), son of Philip Wodehouse (1773–1838)
 Sir Edwin Frederick Wodehouse (c. 1850 – 1934), senior British police officer,  son of  Edwin Wodehouse
Reverend Frederick Armine Wodehouse (1842 – c. 1921),  son of  Philip Wodehouse (1788–1846)
 Norman Wodehouse (1887–1941), Royal Navy vice-admiral, son of Reverend Frederick Armine Wodehouse (1842 – c. 1921)
Henry Ernest Wodehouse (1845–1929), son of Philip Wodehouse (1788–1846)
 P. G. Wodehouse (1881–1975), English humor writer, son of  Henry Ernest Wodehouse 
 Richard Wodehouse (1892–1940), cricketer, son of Henry Ernest Wodehouse  (brother of  P. G. Wodehouse)
 Edmond Wodehouse (1784–1855), MP for Norfolk, and later, Norfolk East,  son of Thomas Wodehouse, younger son of Sir Armine Wodehouse, 5th Baronet 
 Philip Edmond Wodehouse (1811–1887), British colonial administrator, eldest son of  Edmond Wodehouse
 Edmond Robert Wodehouse (1835–1914), British Unionist politician, only child of Philip Edmond Wodehouse
 Armine Wodehouse (MP) (1860–1941), MP for Saffron Walden, a younger son of John Wodehouse, 1st Earl of Kimberley

Notes

References
Lord Wodehouse, The Wodehouses of Kimberley, London (1887).

 
Noble families of the United Kingdom
English toponymic surnames
History of Norfolk